Cherv could refer to:

 Cherv, a Russian film from 2006.
 Cherv, name of Cyrillic letter Che in Old Cyrillic alphabet and the corresponding letter in Glagolitic alphabet.